Keith Da'Shawn "Thump" Belton (born June 1, 1981 in Charlotte, North Carolina) is an American football fullback who was most recently with  the Georgia Force of the Arena Football League. He was originally signed by the Detroit Lions as an undrafted free agent in 2004. He played college football at Syracuse University.

References

External links
Denver Broncos bio

American football fullbacks
Syracuse Orange football players
Chicago Bears players
Denver Broncos players
Players of American football from Charlotte, North Carolina
1981 births
Living people
Georgia Force players